Adrian Bevington (born c. 1971) was Club England Managing Director at  the Football Association (the FA) from 2010 to 2015. He was recently a Non-Executive Director at League Two side Hartlepool United.

In October 2022, Bevington resigned as a Non Executive Director at Hartlepool United.

Career
Bevington was born in Middlesbrough and started his career at ICI as a trainee on the company newspaper C&P News in 1987. He is a lifelong fan of his hometown football team Middlesbrough Football Club, whose media team he later joined. He has also written books on the club, one with fellow press officer Dave Allen, "From Doom to Boom: The Most Dramatic Decade in the Life of Middlesbrough FC" (Hardback, Mainstream Publishing 1996), about the dramatic rebirth of Middlesbrough F.C. following their financial woes in 1986.

He joined the FA's communications division in 1997, since when he has worked with managers Howard Wilkinson, Peter Taylor, Kevin Keegan, Sven-Göran Eriksson, Steve McClaren, Fabio Capello and Roy Hodgson. He has worked with several chief executives, including Brian Barwick, Adam Crozier and Ian Watmore.

On 22 May 2018, it was announced by Middlesbrough that Bevington had joined the club as Head of Recruitment Operations. Bevington left the role in December 2019.

In September 2021, Bevington joined the board at Hartlepool United as a Non-Executive Director.

References

External links

1971 births
Living people
Sportspeople from Middlesbrough
British public relations people
The Football Association
Middlesbrough F.C. non-playing staff
Hartlepool United F.C. non-playing staff